Jared Thomas (born 1976) is an Australian author of children's fiction, playwright and museum curator. Several of his books have been shortlisted for awards, and he has been awarded three writing fellowships.

In May 2018 he began a 12-month secondment as William and Margaret Geary Curator of Aboriginal and Torres Strait Islander Art and Material Culture at the South Australian Museum, and in 2019 he was awarded a Churchill Fellowship to "investigate colonised people's interpretative strategies in permanent gallery displays" in museums abroad.

Early life and education

Thomas was born in Port Augusta in 1976, of Aboriginal, Scottish, and Irish heritage.  He is a Nukunu man, born on Nukunu land in the Southern Flinders Ranges and raised within the Nukunu culture.

He was inspired by seeing the play Funerals and Circuses by Arrernte playwright Roger Bennett when on a school excursion to the Adelaide Fringe Festival in 1992 and decided to study the humanities and writing. After excelling in his undergraduate BA degree at the University of Adelaide, he worked for the Fringe for a while before gaining a traineeship to work as an editor of a publication at the Tandanya National Aboriginal Cultural Institute, where he developed a love of visual arts.

Career 
Working at Adelaide University as an academic advisor, he enrolled for a masters degree in creative writing and wrote plays. His work Love, Land and Money was later produced for the 2002 Adelaide Fringe Festival. After having poems and short stories published in several anthologies, he started focusing on novels, and his first novel, Sweet Guy (2005) was shortlisted in the Victorian Premier's Literary Awards in 2006 and the Festival Awards for Literature.

As lecturer of Communication and Literature at the University of South Australia's David Unaipon College of Indigenous Education and Research, Thomas enrolled for his PhD in Creative Writing, which he completed in 2011.

Thomas was a member of the working party involved in the creation of the First Nations Australia Writers Network (FNAWN) in 2012. In September 2015, in a collaboration with Poets House in New York City, Thomas participated in a recording of six FNAWN members reading their work at a special event, which was recorded. The other readers were Jeanine Leane, Dub Leffler, Melissa Lucashenko, Bruce Pascoe, and Ellen van Neerven.

He has coordinated Nukunu People's Council cultural heritage, language, and arts projects. He was Arts Development Officer, Aboriginal and Torres Strait Islander Arts at Arts SA in 2018, and is an ambassador for the Indigenous Literacy Foundation.

In May 2018 Thomas began a 12-month secondment as William and Margaret Geary Curator of Aboriginal and Torres Strait Islander Art and Material Culture at the South Australian Museum. In this role he curated the Yurtu Ardla exhibition from March to June 2019.

In September 2019 he was awarded a Churchill Fellowship to travel to New Zealand, the US, Canada and Norway, "to investigate colonised people's interpretative strategies in permanent gallery displays".

In 2020, Thomas was employed as Indigenous consultant on two ABC TV series, Stateless and Operation Buffalo.

Works

Novels

 (Contents: 1. Game Day – Patty Hits the Court; 2. Game Day – Patty and the Shadows; 3. Game Day – Patty Takes Charge)

Plays

Love, Land and Money (2002)
Flash Red Ford (1999) - toured Uganda and Kenya, performed by a Ugandan company.

Non-fiction 
"Daredevil Days", chapter in Growing Up Aboriginal in Australia. Black Inc. 2018. ISBN 9781863959810

Awards

Sweet Guy — 2002, shortlisted, Festival Awards for Literature (SA): Award for an Unpublished Manuscript; 2006, shortlisted, Victorian Premier's Literary Awards: Prize for Indigenous Writing
Calypso Summer — 2013 winner, black&write! Indigenous Writing Fellowships; 2014 — shortlisted, Victorian Premier's Literary Award for Indigenous Writing; winner, International White Raven award in 2015, selected by the International Youth Library in Munich, Germany, "given to books that deserve worldwide attention because of their universal themes and/or their exceptional and often innovative artistic and literary style and design".
Patty Hits the Court: Game Day! — 2018, shortlisted, Speech Pathology Australia Book of the Year Awards: Best Book for Language Development, Indigenous Children

References

External links
 Staff profile, SA Museum

21st-century Australian novelists
1976 births
Australian people of Scottish descent
Australian people of Irish descent
Indigenous Australian writers
Writers from South Australia
Living people